Larry Chance (born October 19, 1940) is an American musician and the lead singer of the popular 1960s doo-wop group Larry Chance and the Earls, originally known as The Earls.

He was born Larry Figueiredo in Philadelphia, Pennsylvania.  Upon moving to the Bronx, New York, he originally formed his group as The Hi-Hatters.  The group was eventually rechristened The Earls and Figueiredo changed his last name to Chance, after the record label.  In 1962, the Earls' single "Remember Then" was a national hit.  Other records entered the charts, including "Never" (top 5 on the local New York charts), "Life Is But a Dream" (top 10 on the local New York charts),  and "I Believe", considered an East Coast classic. Other recordings include "Looking For My Baby" and "Kissing". Albums include "Remember Me Baby", "The Earls: Today", "The Earls – LIVE", "Earl Change", and "Streets of the Bronx".

Chance also had a short-lived solo career in the late 1960s, but as the oldies revival scene started a strong run in the early 1970s and 1980s, the Earls became one of the most requested groups in the doo-wop genre and Chance returned to the group.  They continue to perform actively and remain popular on the oldies circuit.

Chance was diagnosed with cancer in 2000, but went successfully through chemotherapy. He performed at the 2001 DOO WOP special in Pittsburgh, and told his fans about his experiences with his illness, before he sang "I Believe".

References

External links 
 Larry Chance and The Earls official website

1940 births
Living people
American male singers
Musicians from Philadelphia
Doo-wop musicians